Antonín Bořuta (born 26 October 1988) is a Czech professional ice hockey defenceman currently playing with UK EIHL side Sheffield Steelers, on loan from HC TWK Innsbruck of the Austrian Hockey League (EBEL). He played with HC Zlín in the Czech Extraliga during the 2010–11 Czech Extraliga season.

References

External links

1988 births
Czech ice hockey defencemen
HC Olomouc players
Orli Znojmo players
VHK Vsetín players
HC TWK Innsbruck players
PSG Berani Zlín players
Sheffield Steelers players
Living people
Sportspeople from Zlín
Czech expatriate sportspeople in England
Czech expatriate sportspeople in Austria
Expatriate ice hockey players in Austria
Expatriate ice hockey players in England
Czech expatriate ice hockey people